Lauri is a surname. Notable people with the surname include:

 Bernardo Lauri (died 1516), Italian bishop
 Carl Lauri (1924–1990), American politician
 Filippo Lauri (1623–1694), Italian painter
 Francesco Lauri (1610–1635), Italian painter
 Giacomo Lauri (1623–1694), Italian engraver
 Giacomo Lauri-Volpi (1892–1979), Italian tenor
 Giuseppe Lauri (born 1976), Italian boxer
 Guido Lauri (1922–2019), Italian dancer
 Hannele Lauri (born 1952), Finnish actress
 Heinrich Lauri (1890–1942), Estonian politician
  (born 1945), Finnish actor
 Kjell Lauri, Swedish orienteer
 Lorenzo Lauri (1864–1941), Italian cardinal
 Maris Lauri (born 1966), Estonian politician
 Miguel Ángel Lauri (1908–1994), Argentine footballer
 Mike Lauri, American musician
 Pietro Lauri, French painter
 Steve Lauri (born 1954), British singer and guitarist
 Tiziana Lauri (born 1959), Italian ballerina

See also 
 Lauri (given name)
 Lauri (disambiguation)
 Laurie (surname)

Estonian-language surnames
Finnish-language surnames
Italian-language surnames